Dennis "Denny" H. Farber (March 8, 1946 – May 8, 2017) was an American painter, photographer and educator. Faber was the director of the Mount Royal School of Art at Maryland Institute College of Art (MICA) from 2000 to 2004 and co-chair of MICA’s Foundations department from 2010 to 2011.

About 
He received a B.A. from Trinity College, in Hartford, Connecticut, in 1968 and an M.F.A. from Claremont Graduate University, Claremont, California, in 1975. 

Farber was a recipient New York Foundation for the Arts Grant in 1987. He was also awarded a National Endowment for the Arts Grant in 1995, two residencies at Yaddo 2004 & 2008, Saratoga Springs, New York, and awarded a Mid Atlantic Council for the Arts Grant in 2005.

Farber's photographs run the gamut from street photography to manipulated images to painted photographs many of which are abstract. The majority of his photographs are large format 20 in × 24 in Polaroid prints. Most of his paintings are completely abstract, such as The Death of President Coolidge in the collection of the Honolulu Museum of Art.

Farber’s photographic work was a part of photography’s expanding boundaries in the 1970s and 1980s. Most of Farber’s pictures came from his collages of found images and re-photographed on the 20 × 24 Polaroid camera.  He participated in Polaroid Corporation’s Artist Support Program. In 1992 his large format Polaroids were showcased in MoMA’s New Photography 8 exhibition. The same year his work was one six contemporary artists’ works in The Jewish Museum’s widely traveled exhibit, Bridges and Boundaries, African Americans and American Jews.  The work was also included in The Edge of Childhood, Heckscher Museum, Huntington, New York, I, Diane Brown Gallery, New York, NY, The Pleasures and Terrors of Domestic Comfort, Baltimore Museum of Art, Baltimore, MD, which began the year before at MoMA, New York.  Farber’s large format Polaroids were also included in OPEN ENDS, Innocence and Experience, Museum of Modern Art’s, (New York, New York) millennial exhibit.

Educator 
He was a professor at Iolani School, Honolulu, HI 1969 – 1971, the University of New Mexico Albuquerque, New Mexico, 1993 – 1998 and the Maryland Institute College of Art (MICA), Baltimore, Maryland (1998 – 2016).

Farber was also an influential teacher, first at the Iolani School, then at both undergraduate and graduate levels at the University of New Mexico (Albuquerque) from 1993 – 1998, and the Maryland Institute College of Art from 1998-2010 in the Foundation and Painting Departments. He also directed MICA’s Mount Royal Graduate School of Art from 2000 – 2004. While living in New York he taught as an adjunct at New York University (NYU). He served as an Associate Dean at both the University of New Mexico (College of Fine Art) and MICA (for the Foundation Department).

Collections

References
 Heartney, Eleanor, Centric 34, Catalog; Dennis Farber, 1989
 The New Yorker, Photography Review, April 12, 1993
 Tokyo Museum of Art, American Perspectives, Photographs from the Polaroid Collection, 2000, 
  Village Voice, Choices, Dennis Farber, May 28, 1991
  Village Voice, Choices, Dennis Farber, March 9, 1993

Footnotes

20th-century American painters
Modern painters
American photographers
2017 deaths
1946 births
Maryland Institute College of Art faculty
University of New Mexico faculty
Claremont Graduate University alumni
Trinity College (Connecticut) alumni